Luíz Antônio dos Santos (6 September 1964 – 6 November 2021) was a Brazilian long-distance runner who specialized in the marathon. Born in Volta Redonda, Rio de Janeiro, he was a World Championships bronze medalist and a 1996 Olympian. He twice won the Chicago Marathon and also won the Fukuoka Marathon.

Career
Santos's first international appearances came in cross country running. He was part of the Brazilian team at the IAAF World Cross Country Championships in 1991 and 1993, as well as being in the top eight at the South American Cross Country Championships in 1992, 1993 and 1994, sharing in the team gold at the latter two editions. He ran four times at the IAAF World Half Marathon Championships (1993, 1994, 1999, 2001) with his best finish being 22nd in 1994.

He made his marathon debut in Blumenau in 1993, winning the race in a time of 2:12:15. Later that year he won the Chicago Marathon with a time of 2:13:14. This made him the third Brazilian man to win that race, following on from victories by Joseildo Rocha and José Cesar de Souza in the two years previous. He performed less well on his next outing in 1994, failing to finish in Gyeongju, but set a personal best at the Boston Marathon with a time of 2:10:39 hours for thirteenth place. He repeated as winner at the Chicago Marathon, claiming the title again in 2:11:16 hours.

The 1995 season proved to be a career high. He was third at the 1995 Boston Marathon, recording a time of 2:11:02 hours, then took the bronze medal at the 1995 World Championships – his international debut at that distance. He ended his successful year with wins at the São Paulo Marathon and the high level Fukuoka Marathon, where his clocking 2:09:30 was a new personal best. Despite being eleventh at the 1996 Boston Marathon, he represented his native country in the men's marathon at the 1996 Summer Olympics, finishing in tenth place. He attempted a title defence in Fukuoka, but came third overall. He began the 1997 season with sixth place at the Rotterdam Marathon in a lifetime best time of 2:08:55 hours. He placed fifth at the 1997 World Championships in Athletics, which led the Brazilian men to the team bronze medal in the 1997 World Marathon Cup.

Santos was runner-up at the Rio de Janeiro Marathon in 1998 and came eleventh in Chicago later that year. He made three marathon appearances in 1999: fourth at the Tokyo International Marathon, eighth in São Paulo and fifth in Hokkaido. His performances declined thereafter, though he made two more international appearances for Brazil in the South American Marathon Cup.

International competitions

See also
List of World Championships in Athletics medalists (men)
List of winners of the Chicago Marathon
Marathons at the World Championships in Athletics
Brazil at the World Championships in Athletics

References

External links
 

1964 births
2021 deaths
People from Volta Redonda
Brazilian male long-distance runners
Brazilian male marathon runners
Brazilian male cross country runners
Olympic athletes of Brazil
Athletes (track and field) at the 1996 Summer Olympics
World Athletics Championships athletes for Brazil
World Athletics Championships medalists
Chicago Marathon male winners
Sportspeople from Rio de Janeiro (state)
20th-century Brazilian people
21st-century Brazilian people